Disembodied is Buckethead's second album under the name Death Cube K (an anagram for Buckethead). It was released on July 22, 1997 by ION Records, and was produced by Bill Laswell.

Track listing

Personnel
Death Cube K ( Buckethead) - guitar, Dr. Phibes organ, stretching rake.
Extrakd - ambient nightmare machete.
Bill Laswell - bass.
Recorded at the Embalming Plant, Oakland; California.
Additional recording and mixing at Greenpoint Studio, Brooklyn; New York.
Produced by Buckethead and Bill Laswell.

References

Buckethead albums
1997 albums
Albums with cover art by Dave McKean
Albums produced by Bill Laswell